Magic Ship is the second studio album by American folk trio Mountain Man. It was released on September 21, 2018 under Bella Union in Europe and Nonesuch Records worldwide.

Critical reception
Magic Ship was met with "generally favorable" reviews from critics. At Metacritic, which assigns a weighted average rating out of 100 to reviews from mainstream publications, this release received an average score of 73, based on 8 reviews. Aggregator Album of the Year gave the release a 75 out of 100 based on a critical consensus of 6 reviews.

James Christopher Monger from AllMusic explained: "Magic Ship delivers a listening experience that's akin to eavesdropping. So unadorned are these largely a cappella songs, both on the production and execution side of the sonic equation, that it feels a bit like somebody stuck a microphone through a cracked door and caught Sarle, Sauser-Monnig, and Meath unaware."

Accolades

Track listing

Charts

Personnel
Amelia Meath – vocals
Molly Sarlé – guitar, vocals
Alexandra Sauser-Monnig – guitar, vocals

Release history

References

2018 albums
Bella Union albums
Nonesuch Records albums